Diaphus whitleyi, is a species of lanternfish found in the Philippines and the Western Central Pacific Ocean.

Etymology
The fish is named in honor of Australian ichthyologist-malacologist Gilbert Percy Whitley (1903–1975).

References

Myctophidae
Taxa named by Henry Weed Fowler
Fish described in 1934